Guanting Hydropower Station,  also spelled Guanting Hydropower Plant,  is the  first automatic power station designed and built by China,  located on the upper reaches of the Yongding River in the western suburbs of Beijing. The source of power for the hydropower station is Guanting Reservoir, which generates electricity equivalent to more than 100,000 tons of coal per year.

History
Guanting Hydropower Station started construction in April 1954.  On December 27, 1955, it was completed to generate electricity.

On December 26, 1955, Peng Zhen cut the ribbon for the commissioning of the first unit of the Guanting Hydropower Station. He pointed out that, "Guanting Hydropower Station not only generates electricity, but also trains and transports cadres".

Guanting Hydropower Station has 3 units. On December 27, 1955, its first unit  generated electricity. In May 1956, the second and third units were put into operation, with a total installed capacity of 30,000 kilowatts, accounting for 14.2% of the installed capacity of the Beijing-Tianjin-Tangshan power grid at that time.

References 

Dams in China
1955 establishments in China
Buildings and structures in Beijing